Surian (also Romanized as Suriān); formerly, Bavanat (Persian: بوانات, also Romanized as Bavānāt and Bawānāt) is a city and capital of Bavanat County, Fars Province, Iran. At the 2006 census, its population was 9,645, in 2,638 families.

References

Populated places in Bavanat County

Cities in Fars Province

ok
nc